Dokka Manikya Vara Prasada Rao (born 5 March 1962) is an Indian politician and he was former spokesperson of INC in Andhra Pradesh & recently he joined YSR Congress Party.

 He was an MLA (2009–2014) from Tadikonda constituency.

Early life
Born to Dokka Deva Bhiksham and Lolamma on 5 March 1962 at Pulipadu Village, Gurazala Mandal in Guntur District, Andhra Pradesh,
Dokka Manikya Varaprasada Rao completed his high school and college education respectively in Zilla Parisdhad High School and Government Junior College, Gurazala of Guntur district. He did graduation in science in SKBR Degree College, Macherla. He is a law graduate from Andhra Christian College of Law, Guntur and he has also obtained L.L.M. from Acharya Nagarjuna University. At present he is doing PhD on "Secularism and Indian Constitution" from Osmania University, Hyderabad.

Career
He quit his position as Legal Officer in South Central Railways and entered into politics as Congress worker inspired by the ideology and activities of the Party. He led the Congress Forum for Intellectuals and played a key role in presenting various important papers on the policies and programs of the congress party. He never hesitated to make the people representatives of all bodies to realise their duties towards the public who elected them.

He was elected to the Andhra Pradesh Legislative Assembly from Tadikonda Constituency in 2004. As MLA he took up various developmental activities in his Constituency. He won this first election from Tadikonda Assembly constituency. He worked as secondary educational minister and later he was Rural Development and National Rural Employment Guarantee Scheme (NREGS) Minister in the cabinet of Government of Andhra Pradesh before bifurcation from 2009 to 2011. After bifurcation he did not contest the general elections held for Andhra Pradesh State in 2014.

References

External links
 Official site

1962 births
Telugu politicians
Living people
Andhra Pradesh MLAs 2004–2009
Andhra Pradesh MLAs 2009–2014
Telugu Desam Party politicians
People from Guntur district
YSR Congress Party politicians
Indian National Congress politicians from Andhra Pradesh